Kira Trusova (born 28 June 1994) is a Russian handball player for Măgura Cisnădie and the Russian national team.

She participated at the 2016 European Women's Handball Championship.

References

1994 births
Living people
Russian female handball players
Sportspeople from Tolyatti